"Heartstrings" is a song by Swedish singer Janet Leon. After Janet was officially confirmed as an contestant for Sweden's Melodifestivalen songwriting competition. Leon performed the song, written by Fredrik Kempe and Anton Malmberg Hård af Segerstad, in third heat of the competition in Skellefteå on 16 February 2013. Janet placed in fifth in the semi-finals and did not qualify for the next round. The song charted 36 on the Swedish charts.

Charts

References

2013 singles
Janet Leon songs
Songs written by Anton Hård af Segerstad
2013 songs
Songs written by Fredrik Kempe